Tanuter (literally house + lord) was the head of an Armenian nakharar house in ancient and medieval Armenia. Prior to the Russian annexation of Eastern Armenia in 1828, the village headmen of a melikdom carried the title.

Armenian noble titles